Drew Nieporent is an American restaurateur based in New York City. His company Myriad Restaurant Group owns and operates numerous restaurants. Nieporent's Nobu and Nobu London both earned two Michelin stars.

Early life and education
Nieporent graduated in 1973 from Stuyvesant High School and in 1977 from Cornell University in Ithaca, New York, with a degree from the School of Hotel Management. At Cornell, he was also a member of the Quill and Dagger society. While at Cornell, he worked on the cruise ships Vistafjord and Sagafjord.

Career
Nieporent founded the Myriad Restaurant Group, which operates Tribeca Grill, Nobu New York City, Nobu Fifty Seven, Nobu London, Nobu Next Door, Bâtard (Formerly Corton), and Crush Wine & Spirits. Since 1985, Myriad has opened and operated more than 35 restaurants worldwide, including Seattle, Louisville, Providence, Boca Raton, London, Moscow, and Citi Field, home of the New York Mets in Flushing, New York. Most recently, Myriad helped to open The Daily Burger at Madison Square Garden.

In 1978, he began his management career with Warner Le Roy at New York City's Maxwell's Plum and Tavern on the Green. He then worked at the French restaurants Le Périgord, La Grenouille, and Plaza Athenee's Le Regence.

Nieporent's first restaurant, Montrachet (1985), earned three stars from The New York Times and kept that rating for 19 years. In 2008, the restaurant reopened as Corton, reinstating its three-star New York Times status and receiving an unprecedented two Michelin stars with chef-partner Paul Liebrandt at the helm. Both Nieporent and Liebrandt were featured in a 2011 HBO documentary A Matter of Taste.

Tribeca Grill (1990), with partner Robert De Niro and investors including Bill Murray, Sean Penn, and Mikhail Baryshnikov, among others, opened in 1990 and continues to operate at the same Tribeca location, in the former Martinson Coffee building.

In 1994, again with partner Robert De Niro and sushi master Nobu Matsuhisa, Drew launched Nobu, which would earn worldwide acclaim. Nobu NYC, Next Door Nobu, and Nobu Fifty Seven have all earned the three-star rating from The New York Times. Nobu NYC was voted Best Restaurant in America by The James Beard Foundation. Nobu has gone on to open restaurants all over the world.

Also, in 1994, Nieporent was one of the few American restaurateurs to go bi-coastal. In collaboration with Robert De Niro, Robin Williams, and Francis Ford Coppola, he opened Rubicon in San Francisco.

Myriad's excellence in wine service hit a milestone when it became the only restaurant group to earn three prestigious Grand Awards from Wine Spectator Magazine. In 2002, Tribeca Grill joined Rubicon and Montrachet (previous award-earners) on the exclusive list. In 2005, Myriad opened Crush Wine & Spirits, which was named the best new wine shop by Food & Wine Magazine, and made Food & Wine's 2017 list of The World's Best Wine Shops.

Drew is on the board of Madison Square Garden's Garden of Dreams Foundation, Citymeals-on-Wheels, Downtown Magazine NYC, and DIFFA, an Honorary Chair of the City Harvest Food Council and Culinary Director of the Jackson Hole Wine Auction. He has co-chaired SOS's Taste of the Nation event in New York City since 1997. He has been honored by Careers Through Culinary Arts Program (2009), American Heart Association (1999), the Tourette Syndrome Association (2000), Food Allergy Initiative (2001), American Liver Foundation (2003), Cancer Research & Treatment Fund (2005), and Kristen Ann Carr Fund (2006). Drew is an auctioneer at charity events.

Nieporent is featured in the 2004 documentary "Eat this New York" and the 2011 documentary A Matter of Taste.

Businesses

Restaurants 

 Tribeca Grill
 Nobu
 Nobu London
 Nobu Next Door
 Nobu 57 
 Bâtard

Stores 

 Crush Wine & Spirits with Josh Guberman and Robert Schagrin

References

External links
Cornell Daily Sun Interview

Cornell University School of Hotel Administration alumni
Living people
American restaurateurs
Place of birth missing (living people)
Year of birth missing (living people)
Stuyvesant High School alumni
James Beard Foundation Award winners